Le Moule is the sixth-largest commune in the French overseas department of Guadeloupe. It is located on the northeast side of the island of Grande-Terre.

History
Beginning 1635 with the arrival of the French and during the 17th century, the village was called Portland. The principal part of the city was located on the actual site of Autre Bord, towards the east. During the 18th century, the city became the stronghold for colonial aristocracy and the center moved to the left bank of river Audoin. This was thanks to the development of sugar cane and for a better placement of the port on the Atlantic Ocean. A lot of important construction took place to protect and improve the city, one of which was a breakwater ("mole" in French) that gave the city its new name, Le Moule, that became Guadeloupe's main commercial port. On September 20, 1828, Le Moule received rights to export its commodities to the metropolitan France without going through Pointe à Pitre. Thus having direct contact with French territory, it became a target for the British fleet during the Napoleon war at the beginning of the 19th century. The heroic battle of 1809 remains a historic date for Guadeloupe.

In practice, all sugar cane, sugar and rum produced in Grande Terre were shipped from Le Moule's port. Consequently, the city enjoyed a flourishing commerce that was further supplemented by shipments of coffee, cotton, fertilizer, coal, building material and spare parts.

During the first half of the 19th century with its numerous refineries and plantations (at first about 30, then about 100), the planters lived a self-sufficient lifestyle farming sugar cane, coffee, cotton, cocoa, spices and other essential food products, thus dominating Guadeloupean economics during the 1850s. After that, they experienced many financial collapses because of failed crops, abolition of slavery, the production of better sugar in Europe and the very strict "colonial pact". Shared farming has become necessary as well as industrial modernization, and steam machines replaced traditional windmills. The sugar crises forced a new decision. In 1901, only four refineries survived: Duchassaing, Zévallos, Marly and Gardel. Le Moule's port lost its place of dominance to Pointe à Pitre, the center of commerce shifted and the city fell into solitude.

The devastating cyclone of 1928 was the sounding force and the point of return for the community. The city not only rose from its ruins thanks to Mayor Charles Romana, but it also constructed new buildings: the townhouse, schools, churches, roads and parks.

In 2002, Gabrielle Louis-Carabin became the mayor of Le Moule, and is also a member of the general council of Guadeloupe.

Le Moule's history, the richest on the island, enabled it to maintain many remains and relics, and to develop centers of interest around them.

Geography
Le Moule is on Grand-Terre Island. The island is a limestone plateau. The settlements in the commune of Le Moule include Boisvin, Conchou, Gardel, Guenette, Laureal, Lemercier, Mahaudiere, Palais-Sainte-Marguerite, Portland, La Rosette, Saint-Marguerite and Zevallos.

Climate
Le Moule is on the island of Guadeloupe in Caribbean, near the Equator. The town experiences warm/hot temperatures at day and cool temperatures at night. The heat and humidity are higher from July to October.

Population

Economy
Le Moule was a sugar port in the 17th-18th centuries. Now tourism has boomed and there are some seaside resorts on nearby beaches. There are two distilleries nearby. Agriculture is predominantly spread around Le Moule with fields growing bananas, sugarcane and livestock rearing.

Education
Public preschools include:
 Ecole maternelle Debibakas Albert
 Ecole maternelle Laura Flessel
 Ecole maternelle Château Gaillard
 Ecole maternelle Soliveau Laure-Laurent
 Ecole maternelle Vitalle Laurette
 Ecole maternelle Dupuits Marie-Eva
 Ecole maternelle Sainte Marguerite

Public primary and elementary schools include:
 Ecole primaire Debibakas Albert
 Ecole primaire Adélaïde Amédée
 Ecole primaire Girard Aristide
 Ecole primaire Boisvin
 Ecole primaire Cocoyer
 Ecole primaire Grands-Fonds
 Ecole primaire Lacroix
 Ecole élémentaire Jean Galleron

Private primary schools include:
 Ecole primaire privée Externat Saint Joseph du Moule

Public junior high schools include:
 Collège Général de Gaulle
 Collège Guénette

Public senior high schools include:
 LP Louis Delgres

Private secondary schools under contract:
 Collège Saint-Dominique

Sights
There are an array of sights to see either in or around Le Moule.

The Damoiseau Distillery is in Bellevue in the middle of a sugar cane field. Production is limited to white rum, old vintage rum and punches, all of which have received numerous awards for their quality.

The Gardel Plant was built under the reconstruction plan for the agriculture sector in 1870, after the historic financial collapse. It is owned by Générale Sucrière, the world leader in the sugar refinery industry. It is the sole refinery on the main island of Guadeloupe and, consequently, a symbol. Its installation in the epicenter of sugar cane plantations affords heavy production from March to July.

The Ouatibi-Tibi Archaeological Park is situated in Morel on 7 hectares of beach that run alongside the lagoon. This is a place for taking strolls, for relaxing and meditating. It is intensely rich in culture and is composed of three sites: a memorial center, an archaeological center and a recreation center.

The Edgar Clerc Museum is a prehistoric pre-Columbian and Amerindian museum unique to the island. It is located west of the city. It showcases the traditions of the Tainos, Caribs, Arawaks and the Caribbean peoples through its collections of pottery and tools found at the diggings of the archaeological park in Morel.

The town hall was reconstructed after the 1928 cyclone by Ali Tur (son of a high ranking government official). Its massive round forms protect it from the natural elements.

In the Moulian countryside are many windmills in sugarcane fields. These were indispensable for grinning the sugar cane before the arrival of steam machines that had larger flat capacity grinners. Dating back to the 18th century, some are still well maintained. The "tour des moulins" (trail of windmills) makes a pleasant route for mountain bike practice.

The Church of Saint Jean Baptiste was constructed in the form of a Latin cross, a neoclassic inspiration. Since its reconstruction in 1840, it has resisted numerous cyclones. Its exceptional ventilation system preserves, wholly intact, a woody decor in pastel tones.

There are many hotels and restaurants which serve French, Continental, Creole and American dishes.

See also
Communes of the Guadeloupe department

References

External links

 Official website 

Communes of Guadeloupe